Robert Abbe Gardner (April 9, 1890 – June 21, 1956) was an American multi-sport athlete best known for winning the U.S. Amateur in golf twice.

Early life
Gardner was born in Hinsdale, Illinois. He spent most of his life in the Chicago area. He attended Phillips Academy in Andover, Massachusetts. He graduated from Yale University in 1912, where he was a member of Skull and Bones.

While a sophomore at Yale, Gardner won the 1909 U.S. Amateur golf tournament over Chandler Egan at the Chicago Golf Club. He was the youngest winner, at 19 years, 5 months, of the U.S. Amateur. His record stood for 85 years until Tiger Woods won his first of three Amateurs at age 18 years, 8 months.

Golf career
Gardner would make the finals of the U.S. Amateur three more times, winning in 1915 and losing in 1916 and 1921. He also lost in the finals of two other prominent amateur events, the 1911 Western Amateur and the 1920 British Amateur.

Golf was not the only sport Gardner excelled at. This record would be short lived as Marc Wright vaulted  one week later at the Olympic trials in Cambridge, Massachusetts.

Gardner also was national champion in another sport, racquets. He and Howard Linn won the national doubles racquets championship in 1926 and 1929.

Military career
Gardner enlisted in the Army in 1917 and served in France during World War I as a lieutenant in a field artillery unit. After the war he returned to Chicago and joined a stock brokerage firm where he spent the rest of his career. He served as president of the Chicago District Golf Association (CDGA) for many years and also served on several United States Golf Association committees. He won the CDGA Amateur Championship three times (1916, 1924, 1925).

Death
Gardner died in Lake Forest, Illinois at the age of 66.

Golfing highlights

Wins
1909 U.S. Amateur
1915 U.S. Amateur
1916 Chicago District Amateur
1924 Chicago District Amateur
1925 Chicago District Amateur

Runner-up finishes
1911 Western Amateur
1916 U.S. Amateur
1920 British Amateur
1921 U.S. Amateur

Amateur major championships

Wins (2)

Results timeline

LA = Low Amateur
NT = No tournament
DNP = Did not play
"T" indicates a tie for a place
DNQ = Did not qualify for match play portion
R256, R128, R64, R32, R16, QF, SF = Round in which player lost in match play
Green background for wins. Yellow background for top-10

Source for U.S. Open and U.S. Amateur: USGA Championship Database

Source for 1920 British Amateur:  The American Golfer, June 19, 1920, pg. 8.
 
Source for 1923 British Amateur:  The American Golfer, July, 1923, pg. 10.

Source for 1926 British Amateur:  The American Golfer, July, 1926, pg. 58.

U.S. national team appearances
Amateur
Walker Cup: 1922 (winners), 1923 (winners, playing captain), 1924 (winners, playing captain), 1926 (winners, playing captain)

References

External links

Yale University biography
New York Times article on his golf and pole vault abilities

American male golfers
Amateur golfers
Yale Bulldogs men's golfers
Golf administrators
Golfers from Illinois
American male pole vaulters
World record setters in athletics (track and field)
Racquets players
United States Army personnel of World War I
United States Army officers
1890 births
1956 deaths